The IPSC North American Championship are IPSC championships hosted in either the United States or Canada.

History 
 1992 Toronto, Canada
 1995 British Columbia, Canada (12. to 16. July)
 1998 PASA, Barry, Illinois, United States (30. June to 3. July)

1992 Championship 
The 1992 championship North American Championship was held in conjunction with both the 1992 U.S. and Canadian national championships. Jerry Barnhart won the U.S. Championship as well as the North American Championship (both the last to feature no divisions), while Steve Johns won the Canadian national championship Open Division title and Ken Bell won the Canadian Standard Division title.

1998 Championship 
The 1998 match was an IPSC level 4 match, and consisted of 24 stages and a minimum of 300 rounds to be shot during three days.

Champions

Overall category

References

IPSC shooting competitions
Shooting sports in North America
Sports competitions in North America